Mühlenau may refer to:

 Mühlenau (Bekau), a river of Schleswig-Holstein, Germany
 Mühlenau (Rellau), a river of Schleswig-Holstein, Germany